Arnaud Alessandria (born July 15, 1993 in Monaco) is an alpine skier from Monaco. He competed for Monaco at the 2014 Winter Olympics in all the alpine skiing events except the slalom.

After missing the 2018 Winter Olympics, Alessandria was named to Monaco's 2022 Winter Olympic team, where he was also the opening ceremony flagbearer.

References

1993 births
Living people
Monegasque male alpine skiers
Olympic alpine skiers of Monaco
Alpine skiers at the 2014 Winter Olympics
Alpine skiers at the 2022 Winter Olympics